= University over the Abyss =

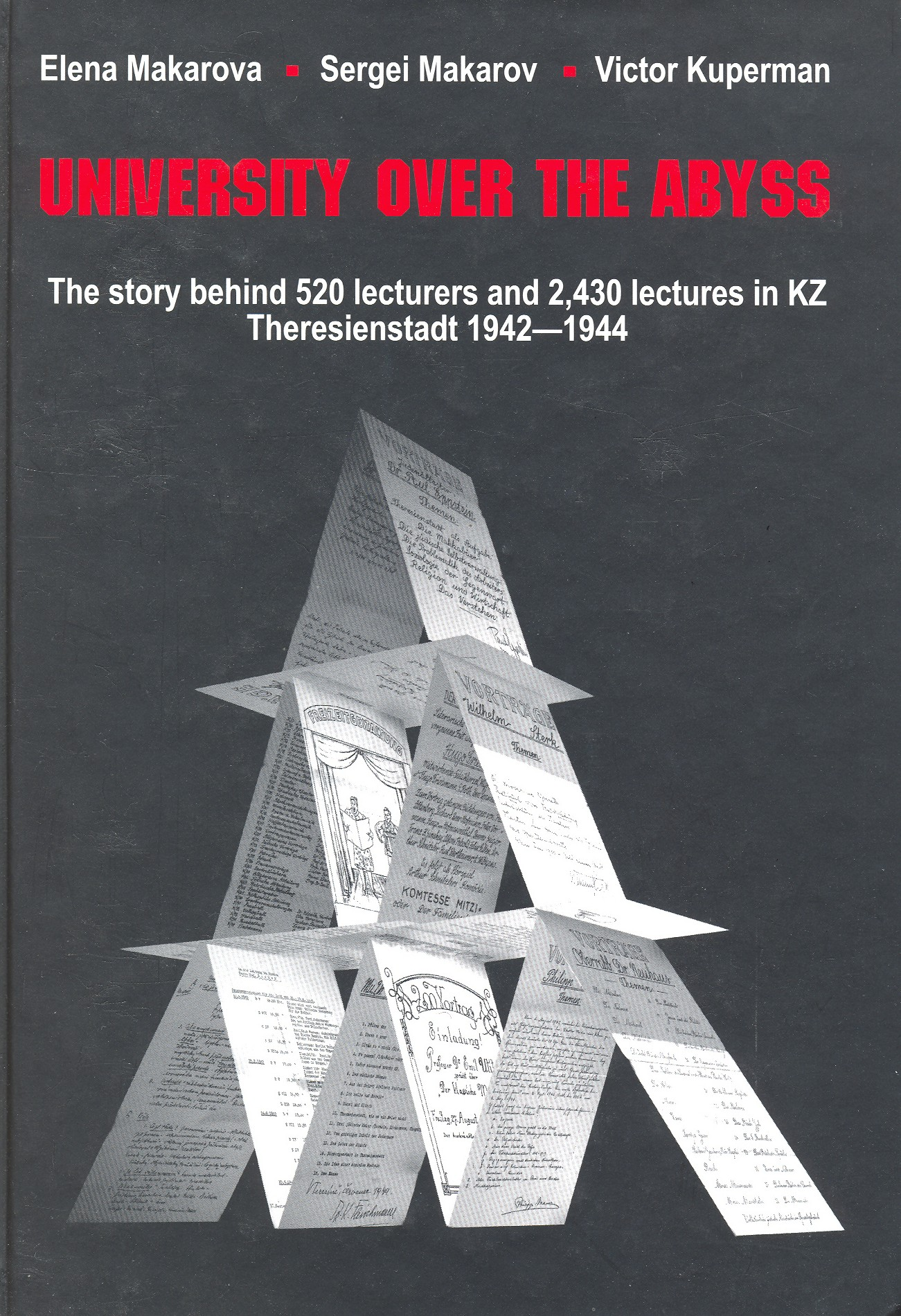

University over the Abyss is a book about the educational and cultural life in the Terezín (German: Theresienstadt) ghetto. Authors Elena Makarova, Sergei Makarov and Viktor Kuperman have searched available archives, interviewed survivors worldwide and compiled the definitive summary of this nominally illegal but extensive phenomenon that included formal lectures, poetry readings, concerts, storytelling sessions and theatrical and opera performances, all in a setting that was a holding place for prisoners who were ultimately on their way to the Auschwitz-Birkenau extermination camp.

This English-language book is published by Verba Publishers in Jerusalem and is now in its second edition. In addition, the book has been published in Czech and in Russian.
